The 2017–18 UT Martin Skyhawks men's basketball team represented the University of Tennessee at Martin during the 2017–18 NCAA Division I men's basketball season. The Skyhawks, led by second-year head coach Anthony Stewart, played their home games at Skyhawk Arena as members of the Ohio Valley Conference. They finished the season 10–21, 5–13 in OVC play to finish in a three-way tie for ninth place. They failed to qualify for the OVC tournament.

Previous season 
The Skyhawks finished the 2016–17 season 22–13, 10–6 in OVC play to win the West Division championship. As the No. 2 seed in the OVC tournament, they defeated Murray State before losing to Jacksonville State in the championship game. They were invited to the CollegeInsider.com Tournament where they defeated UNC Asheville in the first round before losing in the second round to Campbell.

Preseason 
In a vote of conference coaches and sports information directors, UT Martin was picked to finish in eighth place in the OVC. Senior guard Matthew Butler was named to the All-OVC Team.

After five years of divisional play in the OVC, the conference eliminated divisions for the 2017–18 season. Additionally, for the first time, each conference team will play 18 conference games.

Roster

Schedule and results

|-
!colspan=9 style=| Non–conference regular season

|-
!colspan=9 style=| Ohio Valley Conference regular season

Source

References

UT Martin Skyhawks men's basketball seasons
Tennessee-Martin
UT Martin
UT Martin